The following is a list of Research centers at Boston College.

Research centers and institutes
Boisi Center for Religion and American Public Life
Business Institute
Center for Asset Management
Center for Child, Family, and Community Partnerships (CCFCP)
Center for Christian-Jewish Learning
Center for Corporate Citizenship (CCC)
Center for East Europe, Russia, and Asia
Center for Human Rights and International Justice
Center for Ignatian Spirituality
Center for International Higher Education
Center for Investment and Research Management
Center for Irish Programs Dublin
Center for Nursing Research
Center for Retirement Research
Center for the Study of Home and Community Life
Center for Study of Testing, Evaluation, and Educational Policy (CSTEEP)
Center for Work and Family (CWF)
Center on Aging & Work - Workplace Flexibility
Center on Wealth and Philanthropy (CWP, formerly SWRI)
Church in the 21st Century Center
Clough Center for the Study of Constitutional Democracy
EagleEyes Project
Institute for Medieval Philosophy and Theology
Institute of Religious Education and Pastoral Ministry (IREPM)
Institute for Administrators in Catholic Higher Education
Institute for Scientific Research
Institute for the Study and Promotion of Race and Culture (ISPRC)
International Study Center
Irish Institute
Jesuit Institute
Lifelong Learning Institute
Lonergan Institute
Mathematics Institute
Media Research and Action Project
Presidential Scholars Program
Sloan Work and Family Research Network
Small Business Development Center
Urban Ecology Institute
Weston Observatory
Winston Center for Leadership and Ethics
Women's Resource Center

References

Boston College